The coat of arms of Russia derives from the earlier coat of arms of the Russian Empire. Though modified more than once since the reign of Ivan III (1462–1505), the current coat of arms is directly derived from its medieval original, with the double-headed eagle having Byzantine and earlier antecedents. The general tincture corresponds to the fifteenth-century standard.

Description and usage
The two main elements of Russian state symbols (the two-headed eagle and Saint George slaying the dragon) predate Peter the Great. According to the Kremlin's website:
«...четырёхугольный, с закруглёнными нижними углами, заострённый в оконечности красный геральдический щит с золотым двуглавым орлом, поднявшим вверх распущенные крылья. Орел увенчан двумя малыми коронами и — над ними — одной большой короной, соединенными лентой. В правой лапе орла — скипетр, в левой — держава. На груди орла, в красном щите, — серебряный всадник в синем плаще на серебряном коне, поражающий серебряным копьём черного опрокинутого навзничь и попранного конём дракона.»
Which is translated as:
"… a gold two-headed eagle with raised extended wings set against a four-cornered red heraldic shield with rounded lower corners. Two small crowns top the eagle's heads, with one large crown above them. The three crowns are linked by a ribbon. The eagle holds a sceptre in its right claw and an orb in its left claw. The eagle bears a red shield on its breast depicting a silver horseman in a blue cape, mounted upon a silver horse and slaying a black dragon with a silver spear."

The current coat of arms was designed by artist Yevgeny Ukhnalyov; it was adopted on 30 November 1993 by a presidential decree, and then by a federal law signed by President Vladimir Putin on December 20, 2000.

Today, the imperial crowns on each head stand for the unity and sovereignty of Russia, both as a whole and in its constituent republics and regions. The orb and scepter grasped in the eagle's talons are traditional heraldic symbols of sovereign power and authority. Of note is that the scepter shows the Droste effect, as it is topped by a miniature image of the coat-of-arms itself. They have been retained in the modern Russian arms despite the fact that the Russian Federation is not a monarchy, which led to objections by the Communists even though both the blue ribbon and the collar of the Order of St. Andrew (which in the imperial arms supported the three crowns and surrounded the central shield) have been removed from the current coat of arms.

It appears on the federal buildings and is on the cover of the national passport. 

The Standard of the President of Russia 
is a squared Russian tricolour defaced with the coat of arms of Russia, the banner of the Russian Armed Forces also has the coat of arms centered on the obverse side. Some state awards of Russia are also designed based on the coat of arms, including the State Prize. Russian ruble coins depict the coat of arms on the obverse side since 2016.

Historical versions
The heraldic device of Russia has gone through three major periods in its history, undergoing major changes in the transitions between the Russian Empire, the Soviet Union, and the Russian Federation. The use of the double-headed eagle as a Russian coat of arms goes back to the 15th century. With the fall of Constantinople and the end of the Byzantine Empire in 1453, the Grand Dukes of Muscovy came to see themselves as the successors of the Byzantine heritage, a notion reinforced by the marriage of Ivan III to Sophia Paleologue (hence the expression "Third Rome" for Moscow and, by extension, for the whole of Imperial Russia). Ivan adopted the golden Byzantine double-headed eagle in his seal, first documented in 1472, marking his direct claim to the Roman imperial heritage and posing as a sovereign equal and rival to the Holy Roman Empire. In 1497, it was stamped on a charter of share and allotment of independent princes' possessions. At about the same time, the image of a gilt, double-headed eagle on a red background appeared on the walls of the Palace of Facets in the Moscow Kremlin.

The other main Russian coat of arms, the image of St George slaying the dragon, is contemporaneous. In its first form, as a rider armed with a spear, it is found in the seal of Vasili I of Moscow in 1390. At the time of Ivan III, the dragon was added, but the final association with Saint George was not made until 1730, when it was described as such in an Imperial decree. Eventually, St George became the patron saint of Moscow (and, by extension, of Russia).

After the assumption of the title of Tsar by Ivan IV, the two coats are found combined, with the eagle bearing an escutcheon depicting St George on the breast. With the establishment of the Moscow Patriarchate in 1589, a patriarchal cross was added for a time between the heads of the eagle.

1721–1917: Russian Empire

The Russian Empire had a coat of arms, displayed in either its greater, middle and lesser version. Its escutcheon was golden with a black two-headed eagle crowned with two imperial crowns, over which the same third crown, enlarged, with two flying ends of the ribbon of the Order of Saint Andrew. The State Eagle held a golden scepter and golden globus cruciger. On the chest of the eagle there was an escutcheon with the arms of Moscow, depicting Saint George, mounted and defeating the dragon. After approval by Alexander III on 24 July 1882, the greater coat of arms was adopted on 3 November, replacing the previous 1857 version.

Its central element is the coat of arms, crowned with the helmet of Alexander Nevsky, with black and golden mantling, and flanked by the archangels Michael and Gabriel. The collar of the Order of Saint Andrew is suspended from the coat of arms. The whole lies within a golden ermine mantle, crowned by the Imperial Crown of Russia and decorated with black double-headed eagles. The inscription on the canopy reads: Съ Нами Богъ ("God is with us"). Above the canopy stands the state khorugv, of gold cloth, on which is depicted the Medium State Seal. The banner is topped by the State Eagle.

Around the central composition are placed fifteen coats of arms of the various territories of the Russian Empire. Nine of these are crowned and placed on a laurel and oak wreath. Proceeding from the left in a counter-clockwise direction, these represent, as they are included in the full imperial title: the Khanate of Kazan, the Congress Kingdom of Poland, Tauric Chersonesos, the unified coat of arms of the Grand Principalities of Kiev, Vladimir and Novgorod, the dynastic arms of the House of Holstein-Gottorp-Romanov, the Grand Principality of Finland, the Georgian principalities, and the Khanates of Siberia and Astrakhan.

The six upper escutcheons are joint depictions of various smaller principalities and oblasts. From the left in a clockwise fashion, these are: the combined arms of the northeastern regions (Perm, Volga Bulgaria, Vyatka, Kondinsky, Obdorsk), of Belorussia and Lithuania (Lithuania, Białystok, Samogitia, Polatsk, Vitebsk, Mstislavl), the provinces of Great Russia proper (Pskov, Smolensk, Tver, Nizhniy-Novgorod, Ryazan, Rostov, Yaroslavl, Belozersk, Udorsky), the arms of the southwestern regions (Volhyn, Podolsk, Chernigov), the Baltic provinces (Estonia, Courland and Semigalia, Karelia, Livonia) and Turkestan.

The Middle Coat of Arms (Средний государственный герб Российской Империи) is similar to the Great Coat of Arms, excluding the khorugv and the six upper escutcheons. The Abbreviated Imperial Title is inscribed over the perimeter of the Seal. The Lesser Coat of Arms (Малый государственный герб Российской Империи) depicts the imperial double-headed eagle, as used in the coat of arms, with the addition of the collar of the Order of Saint Andrew around the escutcheon of St. George, and the Arms of Astrakhan, Siberia, Georgia, Finland, Kiev-Vladimir-Novgorod, Taurica, Poland and Kazan on the wings (seen clockwise).

In the beginning of the 17th century, with the ascension of the Romanov dynasty and its contacts with Western Europe, the image of the eagle changed. In 1625, for the first time the double-headed eagle appeared with three crowns. Traditionally, the latter have alternatively been interpreted as representing the conquered kingdoms of Kazan, Astrakhan and Siberia, as stated in the first edict concerning the state seal, on 14 December 1667, or as standing for the unity of Great Russia (Russia), Little Russia (the Ukraine) and White Russia (Belarus). Probably under influence from its German equivalent, the eagle, from 1654 onwards, was designed with spread wings and holding a scepter and orb in its claws.

During the reign of Peter the Great, further changes were made. The collar of the newly established Order of Saint Andrew was added around the central escutcheon, and the crowns were changed to the imperial pattern after his assumption of the imperial title in 1721. At about this time, the eagle's color was changed from golden to black, which would be retained until the fall of the Russian monarchy in 1917. A final form for the eagle was adopted by imperial decree in 1729, and remained virtually unchanged until 1853.

During the early 19th century, the eagle designs diversified, and two different variants were adopted by Emperor Nicholas I. The first type represented the eagle with spread wings, one crown, with an image of St.George on the breast and with a wreath and a thunderbolt in its claws. The second type followed the 1730 pattern, with the addition of the arms of Kazan, Astrakhan and Siberia on its left wing and those of Poland, the Taurica and Finland on the right one.

In 1855–57, in the course of a general heraldic reform, the eagle's appearance was changed, mirroring German patterns, while St George was made to look to the left, in accordance with the rules of Western heraldry. At the same time, the full set of coat of arms of Great, Medium and Minor Arms, was laid down and approved. The final revisions and changes were made in 1882–83, and are those described above.

1918–93: Soviet and post-Soviet Russia

The coat of arms of the Russian Soviet Federative Socialist Republic (RSFSR) was adopted on 10 July 1918 by the government of the Russian Soviet Federative Socialist Republic (Soviet Union), and modified several times afterwards. It shows wheat as the symbol of agriculture, a rising sun for the future of the Russian nation, the red star (the RSFSR was the last Soviet Republic to include the star in its state emblem, in 1978) as well as the hammer and sickle for the victory of Communism and the "world-wide socialist community of states".

The Soviet Union state motto ("Workers of the world, unite!") in Russian ('' — ) is also a part of the coat of arms.

The acronym of the RSFSR is shown above the hammer and sickle, and reads '', for "".

Similar emblems were used by the Autonomous Socialist Soviet Republics (ASSR) within the Russian SFSR; the main differences were generally the use of the republic's acronym and the presence of the motto in the language(s) of the titular nations (with the exception of the state emblem of the Dagestan ASSR, which had the motto in eleven languages as there is no single Dagestani language).

The Soviet Union as a whole adopted its emblem in 1923, which remained in use until the dissolution of the Soviet Union in 1991. Although it is technically an emblem rather than a coat of arms, since it does not follow traditional heraldic rules, in Russian it is called , the word used for a traditional coat of arms. It was the first state insignia created in the style known as socialist heraldry, a style also seen in e.g. the Chinese national emblem.

The emblem shows the Soviet emblems of the Hammer and Sickle and the Red Star over a globe, in the center of a wreath wrapped in ribbons emblazoned with the communist motto ("Workers of the world, unite!") in the official languages of the Soviet republics with the Russian inscription in the centre, in the reverse order they were mentioned in the Soviet Constitution. Each Soviet Republic (SSR) and Autonomous Soviet Republic (ASSR) had its own coat of arms, largely inspired by the state emblem of the Union.

Four versions were used: 6 ribbons were used in 1923, which were written on in Russian, Ukrainian, Belarusian, Georgian, Armenian, and Azerbaijani; 11 ribbons with the addition of Turkmen, Uzbek, Tajik, Kazakh, Kyrgyz; 16 with the addition of Estonian, Latvian, Lithuanian, Moldavian, and Finnish. Finally, the inscriptions in Azerbaijani, Turkmen, Uzbek, Tajik, Kazakh and Kyrgyz were updated to reflect their transition from the Latin to the Cyrillic script. The final version of the emblem was adopted in 1956 with the removal of the Finnish inscription from the insignia, reflecting the 1956 transformation of the Karelo-Finnish SSR into the Karelian ASSR.

In 1992, the inscription was changed from RSFSR ('') to the Russian Federation ('') in connection with the change of the name of the state. In 1993, president Boris Yeltsin signed a decree to replace the Communist design by the present coat of arms.

Evolution

See also

 Armorial of Russia
 Coat of arms of Moscow
 Coat of arms of Saint Petersburg
 Russian heraldry
 Flag of Russia

References

External links
  Heraldry of the Russian Empire
  The Code of Principal Laws of the Russian Empire (Свод Основных Государственных Законов, 1906)

 
Russia
National symbols of Russia
Russia
Russia
Russia
Russia
Russia
Russia
Russia
Russia
Russia
Saint George and the Dragon